No code may refer to:

 No Code, a 1996 album by Pearl Jam
 No-code development platform, software development platforms, build software with no code writing
 Low-code development platforms, software development platforms based on graphical user interfaces
 Do not resuscitate, or "no code", a legal order indicating that someone doesn't want CPR